Franck Haise (born 15 April 1971) is a French professional football manager and former player who is the manager of Ligue 1 club Lens. As a player, he was a midfielder.

Early life
Haise was born in Mont-Saint-Aignan, Seine-Maritime.

Coaching style
Haise has generally set up Lens in a 3-4-1-2 formation, although he has at times used a 3-5-2 and a 3-4-3.

Despite mainly using a back three at Lens, he has stated, "I don’t have a favourite system. For some time now, we have often played 3-4-1-2 or 3-5-2 with the midfielder moving. This is the one I use because it more closely matches the squad and the players".

Career statistics

Managerial statistics

References

External links

 

1971 births
Living people
People from Mont-Saint-Aignan
Sportspeople from Seine-Maritime
French footballers
Association football midfielders
FC Rouen players
Stade Lavallois players
AS Beauvais Oise players
Angers SCO players
Ligue 2 players
Championnat National players
French football managers
FC Lorient managers
RC Lens managers
Ligue 2 managers
Ligue 1 managers
Footballers from Normandy